Johnny Robinson (1947–1963) was a young African-American teenager who, at age 16, was shot and killed by a police officer in the unrest following the 16th Street Baptist Church bombing in Birmingham, Alabama. Robinson and several others were allegedly throwing rocks at a car draped with a Confederate flag. A Birmingham police officer, Jack Parker, who was riding in the back seat of a police car, shot and killed Robinson. Parker was never indicted for the killing and claimed that he had only fired a warning shot, and that a stray pellet must have killed Robinson.

Background
Johnny Robinson was born in 1947 and had a difficult upbringing in Birmingham, as the city had seen 50 racially driven bombings from 1945 to 1963. He was the oldest of three children and attended the Alberta Shields School. A few years prior to his death, Robinson's father was murdered by a neighbor, leaving his mother alone to raise her children in a city fraught with racial violence. Robinson had a juvenile record. At 13 years old he was arrested on suspicion of burglary and grand larceny.

Events

Early on Sunday morning, September 15, 1963, a Ku Klux Klan member placed a bomb with a timing device under the side steps of the 16th Street Baptist Church, which had served as the headquarters for the Birmingham Children's Crusade during April and early May. Two hundred worshipers were expected in the church that day and after the bomb detonated in the late morning, three 14-year-old girls and an 11-year-old girl were found killed, with twenty-two wounded. The incident prompted civil unrest that was further provoked by the shooting deaths of two young black men that day: 16-year-old Johnny Robinson, and 13-year-old Virgil Ware.

Ware had been riding on the handlebars of his brother's bicycle when he was shot twice with a revolver by Larry Joe Sims, a white 16-year-old who supported the segregationist movement. Earlier that day, Sims had joined a fellow teenager, Michael Lee Farley, at the headquarters for the National States' Rights Party and set out to cruise the neighborhood together. Sims was later charged with first-degree murder but was convicted of second-degree manslaughter, while Farley pled guilty to second-degree manslaughter. Both teens were sentenced to seven months in jail, which was changed to two years probation.

Robinson was about to join his sister for Sunday dinner, but had accompanied his friends to a gas station that was not far from the 16th Street Baptist Church. Several Caucasian men drove by, yelling racial slurs, waving Confederate flags, and throwing bottles. Robinson and his friends allegedly retaliated by throwing rocks at the cars. A police car then arrived on the scene; a police officer named Jack Parker was in the back seat, pointing a shotgun out the window. Parker later gave two differing accounts of the event, as he both claimed to have fired a warning shot and that the gun went off accidentally. 

Parker was white, as were all Birmingham Police officers at that time. He had joined the police force in 1951 and was 48 years old when he shot Robinson. At the time he was also the head of a Fraternal Order of Police.

Aftermath

After a week of funerals related to the bombing, co-founder of the Alabama Christian Movement for Human Rights Nelson Smith remarked that their people would be hard to restrain when they were still under active threat of bombings.

Two grand juries refused to indict Parker, claiming that there were no reliable witness accounts. Not long after the shooting, he signed a newspaper advertisement advocating against integrating the police department of Birmingham. He resigned 10 years after the shooting.

References 

1947 births
1963 deaths
1963 in Alabama
African-American history in Birmingham, Alabama
African-American-related controversies
African Americans shot dead by law enforcement officers in the United States
Civil rights movement
Crimes in Alabama
Deaths by firearm in Alabama
Deaths by person in Alabama
History of racism in Alabama
Police brutality in the United States
Race and crime in the United States
September 1963 events in the United States